Bolívar is a town in the northern Pacific coastal region of Peru, capital of the Bolívar District and Bolívar Province.

References

Populated places in La Libertad Region